Daniel Farrands (born September 3, 1969) is an American filmmaker who specializes in the horror film genre. His first major credit was as screenwriter of Halloween: The Curse of Michael Myers (1995). He has subsequently worked as a producer, writer, and director of both feature and documentary films. 

He produced the 2009 horror film The Haunting in Connecticut before directing Never Sleep Again: The Elm Street Legacy (2010), a documentary on the A Nightmare on Elm Street film series. Farrands subsequently wrote, produced and directed Crystal Lake Memories: The Complete History of Friday the 13th (2013), a documentary film on the Friday the 13th film series.

Biography
Farrands was born September 3, 1969, in Providence, Rhode Island, but was raised in Santa Rosa, California, in a "strict Catholic household." Farrands developed an interest in horror films as a child, and became enamored with John Carpenter's Halloween (1978) after seeing it air on television as an NBC "Movie of the Week." He graduated from Santa Rosa High School in 1987 before relocating to Los Angeles to pursue a career in film.

In 1990, Farrands approached Halloween producer Moustapha Akkad with a screenplay for a sixth installment in the Halloween film series. A sixth installment was not considered for production until 1995, after Miramax acquired the rights to the Halloween series, and Farrands was appointed as screenwriter. The film, Halloween: The Curse of Michael Myers (1995), was released in September 1995. Though Farrands wrote the original screenplay, developing subplots that had been obliquely established in Halloween 4: The Return of Michael Myers (1988) and Halloween 5: The Revenge of Michael Myers (1989), the final version of the film released to theaters was significantly altered by Miramax and much of the final act was ghostwritten without Farrands' involvement.

Farrands later wrote the horror film The Tooth Fairy (2006), before serving as producer of The Haunting in Connecticut (2009).

In 2010, Farrands directed Never Sleep Again: The Elm Street Legacy, a documentary on the A Nightmare on Elm Street film series, and subsequently wrote, produced and directed Crystal Lake Memories: The Complete History of Friday the 13th, an expansive documentary film on the Friday the 13th film series.

Farrands' other directorial credits include The Amityville Murders (2013), The Murder of Nicole Brown Simpson (2019), Ted Bundy: American Boogeyman, and Aileen Wuornos: American Boogeywoman (both 2021).

Filmography

Films

Other

Television

Short films

Accolade

See also
 :Category:Films directed by Daniel Farrands

References

External links
 

Living people
1969 births
American film directors
American documentary film directors
American male screenwriters
American screenwriters
20th-century American writers
21st-century American writers
Film directors from California
Film directors from Rhode Island
Screenwriters from California
Screenwriters from Rhode Island
People from Santa Rosa, California